Bhoganur is a village in Dharwad district of Karnataka, India.

Demographics
As of the 2011 Census of India there were 228 households in Bhoganur and a total population of 1,159 consisting of 612 males and 547 females. There were 125 children ages 0-6.

References

Villages in Dharwad district